"She's Getting Serious" is a song recorded by Canadian country music group Thomas Wade & Wayward. It was released in 1997 as the fourth single from their debut album, Thomas Wade & Wayward. It peaked at number 6 on the RPM Country Tracks chart in September 1997.

Chart performance

Year-end charts

References

1996 songs
1997 singles
Thomas Wade (singer) songs